Cacela may refer to:
 Vila Nova de Cacela, a civil parish of the municipality of Vila Real de Santo António, Algarve, Portugal.
 Cacela Island, a peninsula located in the same civil parish.
 Cacela Velha, a village also located in the same civil parish.